Atropellis is a genus of fungi in the family Dermateaceae. The genus contain four species.

See also
List of Dermateaceae genera

References 

Dermateaceae genera
Dermateaceae